The AEG C.V was a prototype two-seat biplane reconnaissance aircraft of World War I. Designed to use a more powerful engine than previous AEG C-class reconnaissance aircraft, results were disappointing enough that further development was cancelled.

Specifications (AEG C.V)

See also

References

Further reading

 Kroschel, Günter; Stützer, Helmut: Die deutschen Militärflugzeuge 1910-18, Wilhelmshaven 1977
 Munson, Kenneth: Bomber 1914–19, Zürich 1968, Nr. 20
 Nowarra, Heinz: Die Entwicklung der Flugzeuge 1914-18, München 1959
 Sharpe, Michael: Doppeldecker, Dreifachdecker & Wasserflugzeuge, Gondrom, Bindlach 2001, 

C.V
Single-engined tractor aircraft
Biplanes
1910s German military reconnaissance aircraft
Aircraft first flown in 1916